Maxim Vyachaslavavich Gustik (born 1 May 1988) is a Belarusian freestyle skier. He won a bronze medal in aerials at the FIS Freestyle Ski and Snowboarding World Championships 2015. In December 2017, Maxim Gustik won silver medal with 117.26 points at Freestyle Ski Aerial World Cup.

References

1988 births
Living people
Belarusian male freestyle skiers
Freestyle skiers at the 2018 Winter Olympics
Freestyle skiers at the 2022 Winter Olympics
Olympic freestyle skiers of Belarus